Two member states of the European Union held elections to the European Parliament in 2007. For details, see

2007 European Parliament election in Bulgaria
2007 European Parliament election in Romania

 
European Parliament elections